White Settlement is a city in Tarrant County, Texas, United States, and a northwestern suburb of Fort Worth. The population was 17,851 in 2019.

History
The city got its name because it was the lone settlement of white colonists amid several Native American villages in the Fort Worth area in the Texas Republic territory in the 1840s.

On October 14, 2005, city leaders, citing hurdles in attracting businesses, announced a plan to have local voters decide on a possible name change for the town from White Settlement to West Settlement. In the November 8 election, the name change was overwhelmingly rejected by a vote of 2,388 to 219.

The oldest street in White Settlement is White Settlement Road. This original trail led from the fort to the "white settlement" about eight miles west into Native American territory. As the Native Americans were forced from the area and the settlement moved westward, the road followed. This was the only public road in White Settlement's early history.

Two members of the city's West Freeway Church of Christ were killed by a gunman on December 29, 2019, during a morning service. The shooter was in turn killed by a church member.

Most recent White Settlement mayor Ronald White died in office on January 17, 2023.

Geography

White Settlement is located at  (32.759280, –97.460442).

Demographics

2020 census

As of the 2020 United States census, there were 18,269 people, 6,290 households, and 4,010 families residing in the city.

2000 census
As of the census of 2000, there were 14,831 people, 5,614 households, and 3,789 families residing in the city. The population density was 3,043.9 people per square mile (1,175.8/km2). There were 6,027 housing units at an average density of 1,237.0 per square mile (477.8/km2).

Race and ethnicity 
The racial makeup of the city was 85.8% White, 4.1% African American, 0.6% Native American, 1.5% Asian, 0.1% Pacific Islander, 4.5% from other races, and 3.5% from two or more races. Hispanic or Latino of any race were 13.6% of the population.
There were 5,614 households, out of which 34.9% had children under the age of 18 living with them, 45.3% were married couples living together, 16.7% had a female householder with no husband present, and 32.5% were non-families. 26.8% of all households were made up of individuals, and 9.0% had someone living alone who was 65 years of age or older. The average household size was 2.55 and the average family size was 3.08.

Median age 
In the city, the population was spread out, with 27.3% under the age of 18, 10.3% from 18 to 24, 30.0% from 25 to 44, 20.0% from 45 to 64, and 12.4% who were 65 years of age or older. The median age was 34 years. For every 100 females, there were 93.2 males. For every 100 females age 18 and over, there were 89.3 males.

Median income 
The median income for a household in the city was $32,598, and the median income for a family was $36,338. Males had a median income of $28,363 versus $22,250 for females. The per capita income for the city was $14,440. About 11.2% of families and 15.2% of the population were below the poverty line, including 19.9% of those under age 18 and 10.1% of those age 65 or over.

Religion 
57.3% of the people in White Settlement are religious. 19.3% are Baptist, 0.3% are Episcopalian, 11.7% are Catholic, 0.9% are Lutheran, 6.4% are Methodist, 1.7% are Pentecostal, 0.7% are Presbyterian, 1.3% are Latter Day Saint, 12.0% are another Christian faith, 0.2% practice Judaism, 0.5% are an eastern faith, and 2.3% affiliate with Islam.

Culture

White Settlement is also the winter home of several groups of Irish Travellers.

The majority of White Settlement residents identify as Protestant Christians; however, there is also a Mormon church as well as a Buddhist temple within the city limits.

The Texas Civil War Museum is located in White Settlement.

Government and infrastructure
The Naval Air Station Joint Reserve Base Fort Worth has some territory in White Settlement.  The United States Postal Service operates the White Settlement Post Office. The city is under the jurisdiction of Tarrant County and operates as a Council-Manager government type.

Education
The City of White Settlement is served by the White Settlement Independent School District. In 2009, the school district was rated "academically acceptable" by the Texas Education Agency.

The White Settlement Public Library is located in the Municipal Complex.

References

External links
 City of White Settlement official website
 White Settlement Area Chamber of Commerce website
 White Settlement Public Library
 Town to keep White name
 History of White Settlement

Cities in Tarrant County, Texas
Cities in Texas
Dallas–Fort Worth metroplex
Irish-American history and culture in Texas
Irish Travellers